The Grim Adventures of Billy & Mandy is an American animated television series created by Maxwell Atoms for Cartoon Network. The series originally premiered as segments of Grim & Evil on August 24, 2001. The segments were spun-out into their own series on June 13, 2003 (although the 2003-2004 episodes were also produced originally for Grim & Evil), and continued to air until November 9, 2007. A spin-off film, titled Underfist: Halloween Bash, aired on October 12, 2008.

A total of 78 half-hour episodes were produced, including one hour-long Holiday special and four feature-length TV films, bringing the total number of episodes to 86, in the form of 160 segments. The episode "Billy and Mandy Moon the Moon" was part of Cartoon Network's "Invaded" event, which included other shows such Foster's Home for Imaginary Friends, Ed, Edd n Eddy, My Gym Partner's a Monkey, and Camp Lazlo, with Billy & Mandy being the last to air.

Series overview

Episodes

Season 1 (2001–04)
Grim & Evil had two seasons produced with 27 half-hour episodes. Episodes from both seasons of the show are considered the entire first season of the Grim Adventures of Billy & Mandy.

Season 1a (2001–02)

Season 1b (2003–04)

Season 2 (2004)

Season 3 (2005)

Season 4 (2005)

Season 5 (2006)

Season 6 (2006–07)

Specials

Films (2007–08)

Codename: Kids Next Door crossover (2007)

Shorts

Billy's Birthday Shorties (2006)
These shorts were parts of a mini-series called Billy's Birthday Shorties, which mostly starred Billy. The shorts revolved around Billy's birthday and aired on "The Grim and Courage Hour", an hour-long block of episodes from The Grim Adventures of Billy & Mandy and Courage the Cowardly Dog. It aired for four days in October 2006 on Cartoon Network.

Irwin Hearts Mandy (2007)
On February 14, 2007, four shorts aired entitled Irwin Hearts Mandy.

Other shorts

Home media

The entire series has been made available for purchase on the iTunes Store.

See also
 List of Grim & Evil episodes
 List of Evil Con Carne episodes

References

 "The Grim Adventures of Billy & Mandy" at IMDB
 "The Grim Adventures of Billy & Mandy" episode list at IMDB. Also lists the Evil Con Carne episodes from Season 1

External links
 The Grim Adventures of Billy & Mandy at Cartoon Network

Lists of American children's animated television series episodes
Lists of Cartoon Network television series episodes
Episodes